William Purnell Jackson (January 11, 1868March 7, 1939) was a Republican member of the United States Senate, representing the State of Maryland from 1912 to 1914.  His father, William Humphreys Jackson, was a U.S. Congressman from Maryland.

Biography
Jackson was born in Salisbury, Maryland, and attended the public schools of Wicomico County, Maryland and the Wilmington Conference Academy of Dover, Delaware.  He engaged in the lumber business in 1887.

Jackson became a member of the Republican National Committee in 1908, and was appointed to the U.S. Senate to fill the vacancy caused by the death of Senator Isidor Rayner in 1912.  While senator, Jackson served as chairman of the Committee on Expenditures in the Department of State (Sixty-second Congress).

A special election was called in 1913 to choose Rayner's successor, but Jackson chose not to become a candidate.  He served from November 29, 1912, until January 28, 1914, when an elected successor, Blair Lee I, officially qualified for the position.

Following his short tenure in the Senate, Jackson resumed his former business pursuits in the lumber business.  Jackson later served as Maryland State treasurer from 1918 to 1920; as president of the Salisbury National Bank; and a director of the Baltimore, Chesapeake & Atlantic Railway Company.

Jackson died in his hometown of Salisbury in 1939, and is buried at Parsons Cemetery.  The home he built at Salisbury in 1893, the Sen. William P. Jackson House, was listed on the National Register of Historic Places in 1976, but demolished that same year.

References
Notes

Bibliography

External links

William Jackson at Flickr

1868 births
1939 deaths
State treasurers of Maryland
Maryland Republicans
People from Salisbury, Maryland
Republican Party United States senators from Maryland
Wesley College (Delaware) alumni
20th-century American politicians